Yangon Circular Railway is the local commuter rail network that serves the Yangon metropolitan area. Operated by Myanmar Railways, the  39-station loop system connects satellite towns and suburban areas to the city. Circa 2008–2010, the railway had about 200 coaches, had 20 daily runs, and sold 100,000 to 150,000 tickets daily.
The railway is heavily utilized by lower-income commuters, as it is (along with buses) the cheapest method of transportation in Yangon.

The hours of service have been consistent over the years, from 3:45 am to 10:15 pm daily. In 2011, the cost of a ticket for a distance of 15 miles was two hundred kyats (~eighteen US cents), and that for over 15 miles was four hundred kyats (~37 US cents). In the new currency (introduced in 2012) long distance tickets are 200 kyat (~20 US cents).

History
Yangon Circular Railway was built during colonial times by the British. The double track railway was built in 1954.

In July 2011, the Ministry of Rail Transportation announced that it intended to privatize the Yangon Circular Railway, since the government-run system operates at a loss for the government, with monthly operating costs about 260 million kyats and monthly revenues about 42 million kyats. Ticket prices have been kept low because of ministry subsidies.

In December 2012, Japan International Cooperation Agency began its collaboration with Yangon City Development Committee to develop a master plan for the Greater Yangon region, including the issue of public transport.  In 2015 air conditioned coaches were introduced with a slightly higher ticket cost, but these did not last long, and by mid 2016 air conditioning was no longer available.

Myanmar Railways has had plans for a major upgrade for the Circle Line since 2012. It is to be funded in large part by a $212 million loan from Japan’s development agency.  The hope is for all of the coaches and engines to be replaced by 2020, along with automation of the signaling systems and replacement of the aging tracks.  The frequency of trains would be increased from the current two per hour. In December, 2020, a contract was awarded to a consortium of Japan's Mitsubishi and Spain's CAF to provide 11 six-car diesel powered trains with the aim of reducing the travel time of the full loop from 170 to 110 minutes.

Route and stations
The loop network consists of 39 stations, linking various parts of Yangon.  The entire circular trip takes approximately 3 hours. Map from train is shown to the right, with approximate location of stations.

The loop begins from Yangon Central Railway Station to Mingaladon Railway Station near Yangon International Airport, via Insein to the west and Okkalapa in the east.

The major stations are as follows:

 Yangon Central
 Dagon University
 Danyingon
 Hlawga
 Insein
 Mingaladon
 Okhposu
 Paywetseikkon
 Thilawa
 Togyaunggalay
 Ywathagyi
 University of Computer Studies, Yangon

Rolling stock 
 KiHa 40 series
 KiHa 11
 KiHa 38

Gallery

See also

References

Railway loop lines
Metre gauge railways in Myanmar
Transport in Yangon
Articles containing video clips